This list of the Paleozoic life of Virginia contains the various prehistoric life-forms whose fossilized remains have been reported from within the US state of Virginia and are between 538.8 and 252.17 million years of age.

A

 †Acanthocrania
 †Acanthoparypha – type locality for genus
 †Acanthoparypha chiropyga – type locality for species
 †Acanthoparypha perforata – type locality for species
 †Acmarhachis
 †Acmarhachis acuta
 †Adiantities
 †Adiantities spectabilis
 †Aechimina
 †Agassizocrinus
 †Agassizocrinus ovalis – or unidentified comparable form
 †Allorisma
 †Ambocoelia
 †Ambocoelia umbonata
 †Ambonychia
 †Ambonychia bowmani
 †Amecephalina
 †Amecephalina poulseni
 †Amphigenia
 †Amphigenia curta
 †Amphilichas
 †Amphilichas minganensis
 †Amplexograptus
 †Amplexograptus confertus
  †Amplexopora
 †Ampyx
 †Ampyx virginiensis
 †Ampyxina
 †Ampyxina lanceola – type locality for species
 †Ampyxina powelli
 †Anazyga
 †Anazyga recurvirostra
 †Ancanthoparypha
 †Anguloceras – type locality for genus
 †Anguloceras depressum – type locality for species
 †Anguloceras ovatum – type locality for species
 †Anguloceras rotundum – type locality for species
 †Anolotichia
 †Anolotichia explanata – or unidentified comparable form
 †Anoplia
 †Anoplia nucleata
 †Anoplotheca
 †Anoplotheca sulcata
 †Antagmus
 †Anthracospirifer
 †Anthracospirifer leidyi
 †Aphelaspis
 †Aphelaspis quadrata – tentative report
 †Apianurus
 †Apianurus barbatus – type locality for species
 †Apianurus glaber – type locality for species
 †Archaeocyathus
 †Archaeocyathus resseri
 †Archaeosycon
 †Archaeosycon balsami – type locality for species
  †Archimedes
  †Arthrorhachis
 †Athyris
 †Athyris angelica
 †Athyris lamellosa
 †Atlanticocoelia
 †Atlanticocoelia acutiplicata
 †Atrypa
  †Atrypa reticularis
  †Aulopora
  †Aviculopecten
 †Aviculopecten monroensis

B

 †Bassleroceras
 †Bassleroceras bridgei
 †Bassleroceras dalevillense
 †Bathyholcus
 †Bathyholcus gaspensis
 †Bathyurus
 †Batostoma
 †Batostoma campensis
 †Batostoma sevieri
 †Batostoma suberassum – or unidentified comparable form
 †Batostomella
  †Bellerophon
 †Bellerophon scissile – or unidentified comparable form
 †Bellerophon spergensis – tentative report
 †Bellimurina
 †Bellimurina charlottae
 †Berounella
 †Billingsaria
 †Billingsaria parva
 †Bilobia
 †Bimuria
 †Bimuria immatura – type locality for species
 †Bimuria lamellosa
 †Bimuria superba
 †Blountia
 †Blountia virginica
 †Blountiella
 †Blountiella buttsi – tentative report
 †Bollia – tentative report
 †Bollia diceratina
 †Bonnemaia
 †Bonnia
 †Bonnia crassa
  †Bothriolepis
 †Bothriolepis virginiensis – type locality for species
 †Brachyprion
 †Bronteopsis
 †Bucanella
 †Bucanella nana – or unidentified comparable form
 †Bucania
 †Bumastoides
  †Bumastus
 †Bumastus lioderma – or unidentified comparable form
 †Buthotrephis
 †Buthotrephis flexuosa – or unidentified comparable form
 †Buthotrephis gracilis
 †Buthotrephis inosculata
 †Byssonychia
 †Byssonychia praecursa
 †Bythopora

C

 †Caborcella
 †Calipernurus
 †Calipernurus insolitus – type locality for species
 †Callixylon
  †Calymene
 †Calyptaulax
 †Calyptaulax annulata
 †Calyptaulax annulatus
 †Calyptaulax callicephala
 †Calyptaulax callirachis – type locality for species
 †Calyptaulax confluens
 †Calyptaulax gracilens – or unidentified comparable form
 †Camarocladia
 †Camarocladia gracilis
 †Camarotoechia
 †Camarotoechia contracta
 †Camarotoechia quadriplicata
 †Camarotoechia varians – or unidentified comparable form
 †Camerella
 †Camerella varians
 †Campbelloceras
 †Campbelloceras brevicameratum
 †Campbelloceras virginianus
 †Canarekka
 †Canarekka varians – or unidentified comparable form
 †Caneyella
 †Carabocrinus
 †Cardiopteris
 †Cardiopteris abbensis – type locality for species
 †Cardiopteris irregularis – type locality for species
 †Carickia
 †Cariniferella
 †Carniferella
 †Carniferella carinata
 †Caryocystites
 †Cavifera
 †Cavifera concinna – or unidentified comparable form
 †Centrotarphyceras
 †Centrotarphyceras bridgei
 †Centrotarphyceras macdonaldi
 †Ceramoporella
 †Ceratocephala
 †Ceratocephala laciniata – type locality for species
 †Ceratocephala rarispina – type locality for species
 †Ceratocephala triacantheis – type locality for species
 †Ceratocephala tridens
 †Ceratopea – type locality for genus
 †Ceratopea grandis
 †Ceratopea keithi – type locality for species
 †Ceratopsis
 †Ceratopsis chambersi
 †Ceraurinella – type locality for genus
 †Ceraurinella chondra – type locality for species
 †Ceraurinella typa – type locality for species
  †Ceraurus
 †Ceraurus whittingtoni
 †Charionella
 †Charionella scitula
 †Chasmatopora
 †Chasmotopora
 †Chazydictya – tentative report
 †Cheilocephalus
 †Cheirocrinus
 †Cheirocrinus angulatus – tentative report
 †Chepuloceras – type locality for genus
 †Chepuloceras inelegans – type locality for species
 †Chlidanophyton
 †Chlidanophyton dublinensis
 †Chomatopyge
 †Chomatopyge falcata – type locality for species
 †Chomatopyge marginifera – type locality for species
 †Chonetes
 †Chonetes chesterensis
 †Chonetes mucronatus
 †Chonetes novascoticus
 †Chonetes shumardonus
 †Christiania
 †Christiania subquadrata
 †Christiania trentonensis
  †Cincinnetina
 †Cincinnetina meeki
 †Cincinnetina multisecta
 †Cladopora
 †Clarkoceras – tentative report
 †Cleiocrinus
 †Cleiocrinus tessellatus – or unidentified comparable form
  †Cleiothyridina
 †Cleiothyridina sublamellosa – or unidentified comparable form
 †Cleirocrinus
 †Cleirocrinus tessellatus – or unidentified comparable form
  †Climacograptus
 †Climacograptus scharenbergi
 †Cliothyridina
 †Cliothyridina sublamellosa
 †Coeloclema – tentative report
 †Coelospira
 †Coelospira hemisphaerica
 †Coelospira nitens
 †Coelospira planoconvexa
 †Coleoloides
 †Colpomya
 †Colpomya faba
 †Columbocystis
 †Columbocystis typica
 †Columnaria
 †Columnaria halli
  †Composita
 †Composita subquadrata – or unidentified comparable form
 †Conocardium
 †Conocerina
 †Conotreta
 †Conotreta cuspidata
 †Conotreta plana
  †Constellaria
 †Constellirostra
 †Conularia
 †Coosia
 †Coosia alethes
 †Coosia calanus
 †Coosina
 †Coosina ariston
 †Corineorthis
 †Cornellites
  †Cornulites
 †Cornulites flexuosus – or unidentified comparable form
 †Craniops
 †Crepicephalus
 †Crepicephalus rectus
 †Crossia
 †Crossia virginiana
 †Cryptolithus
 †Cryptolithus tesselatus
 †Cryptophragmus
 †Cryptophragmus antiquatus
 †Ctenodonta
 †Ctenodonta pulchella
 †Ctenoloculina
 †Cuneamya
 †Cuneamya scapha
 †Cuneamya umbonata
 †Cupularostrum
 †Cupularostrum congregata
 †Cupularostrum contracta
 †Cybeloides
 †Cybeloides virginiensis
 †Cyclospira
 †Cymatonota
 †Cymatonota pholadis – or unidentified comparable form
 †Cypricarculana – tentative report
 †Cypricardella
  †Cyrtoceras
 †Cyrtodonta
 †Cyrtodontula
 †Cyrtodontula massanuttenensis
 †Cyrtodontula nasuta
 †Cyrtonella
 †Cyrtonotella
 †Cyrtonotella grandistriata
  †Cyrtospirifer
 †Cyrtospirifer disjunctus
 †Cystelasma
 †Cystelasma quinquiseptatum
 †Cystiphylloides
 †Cystiphyllum
 †Cystodictya
 †Cystodictya lineata
 †Cystodictya ovatipora

D

 †Dactylogonia
 †Dactylogonia palustris – or unidentified related form
 †Dakeoceras
 †Dalmanella
 †Dalmanella bassleri
 †Dalmanella costellata
 †Dalmanella fertilis
 †Dalmanella rogata
 †Dalmanella sculpta – or unidentified comparable form
  †Dalmanites – or unidentified comparable form
 †Decoroproetus
 †Dekayia
 †Delocrinus
 †Densastroma
 †Densastroma pexisum
 †Dermatostroma
 †Devonochonetes
 †Devonochonetes scitulus – or unidentified comparable form
 †Diabolocrinus
 †Diacanthaspis
 †Diacanthaspis cooperi – type locality for species
 †Diacanthaspis lepidus – type locality for species
 †Diacanthaspis orandensis – type locality for species
 †Diacanthaspis scitulus – type locality for species
 †Diacanthaspis secretus – type locality for species
 †Diacanthaspis ulrichi – type locality for species
 †Diaphragmus
 †Dicellograptus
 †Dicellomus
 †Dicellomus appalachia
 †Dichotrypa
 †Dichotrypa flabellum – tentative report
 †Dictyoclostus
 †Dictyoclostus burlingtonensis
 †Dictyoclostus inflatus
 †Dictyoclostus parvus
 †Dictyoclostus scitulus
 †Dielasma
 †Dielasma arkansanum – or unidentified comparable form
 †Dimeropyge
 †Dimeropyge spinifera – type locality for species
 †Dimeropyge virginiensis – type locality for species
 †Dinorthis
 †Dinorthis atavoides
 †Dinorthis interstriata
 †Dinorthis transversa
 †Dinorthis willardi
 †Dionide
 †Dionide holdeni
  †Diplograptus
 †Diplograptus foliaceus
 †Diplograptus vespertinus – or unidentified comparable form
 †Dizygopleura
 †Doleroides
 †Doleroides ponderosus – type locality for species
 †Dolichoharpes
 †Dolichoharpes reticulata
 †Donaldina
 †Douvillina
 †Drabia
 †Drabia curtoccipita
 †Drepanella
 †Drepanella richardsoni
 †Dromopus
 †Dromopus aduncus
 †Dunderbergia
 †Dunderbergia simplex
 †Dunderbergia variagranula – or unidentified comparable form
 †Dystactispongia
 †Dystactospongia
 †Dystactospongia minor

E

 †Ecculiomphalus
 †Eccyliopterus
 †Echinoconchus
 †Echinoconchus elegans – or unidentified related form
 †Echinocrinus
  †Echinosphaerites
 †Echinosphaerites aurantium
 †Ectenoceras
 †Ectenoceras chepultepecense
 †Ectenoceras compressum
 †Ectenoceras exile
 †Ectenoceras longum
 †Edmondia – tentative report
 †Edmondia
 †Elliptoglossa
 †Elliptoglossa ovalis
 †Elliptoglossa rotundata
 †Embolophyllum
 †Embolophyllum schucherti
 †Encrinuroides
 †Eodevonaria
 †Eodevonaria arcuata
 †Eoharpes
 †Eomonorachus
 †Eophacops
 †Eoplectodonta
 †Eoplectodonta alternata
 †Eopsongia
 †Eoptychoparia
 †Eoptychoparia clearbranches
 †Eoptychoparia taylori
 †Eospongia
 †Eospongia roemeri
 †Eospongia varians
 †Eotomaria
 †Eotomaria canalifera
 †Epiphyton
 †Eridorthis
 †Eridorthis inexpecta – type locality for species
 †Eridotrypa
 †Escharopora
 †Escharopora subrecta
 †Esharopora
  †Ethmophyllum
 †Ethmophyllum whitneyi
 †Euchasma
 †Euchasma blumenbachi
 †Euphemites
 †Euphemites galericulatus
 †Eurychilina
 †Eurychilina latimarginata – or unidentified comparable form
 †Eurychilina subradiata
 †Eurystomites
 †Eurystomites bolarensis
 †Eustephanella
 †Eustephanella catastephanes

F

 †Fardenia
  †Favosites
 †Fenestralia
 †Fenestralia sanctiludovici
 †Fenestrellina
 †Fenestrellina regalis – tentative report
 †Fenestrellina serratula
 †Fenestrellina tenax
 †Finkelnburgia
 †Finkelnburgia buttsi
 †Fletcheria – tentative report
 †Fletcheria incognita – or unidentified comparable form
  †Flexicalymene
 †Flexicalymene senaria
 †Foerstia
 †Foerstia ohioensis
 †Furcitella
 †Furcitella plicata – type locality for species

G

 †Gasconadia
 †Gasconadia putilla
 †Genselia
 †Girtyella
 †Girtyella indianensis
 †Girtyella turgida
 †Girvanella
 †Glaphyraspis
 †Glaphyraspis ovata
 †Glaphyraspis parva
 †Glauconome
 †Glenodonta
 †Globocrinus
 †Globocrinus unionensis – or unidentified comparable form
 †Glyptambonites
 †Glyptambonites glyptus – type locality for species
 †Glyptambonites musculosus
 †Glyptometopsis
 †Glyptometopsis marginata
 †Glyptometopsis tumida
 †Glyptopora
 †Glyptorthis
 †Glyptorthis bellarugosa
 †Glyptorthis bellatula – type locality for species
 †Glyptorthis equiconvexa
 †Glyptorthis glypta – type locality for species
 †Glyptorthis senecta – type locality for species
 †Glyptorthis uniformis – type locality for species
 †Gnetopsis
 †Gnetopsis hispida
 †Gonioceras
 †Grammysia
 †Graphiadactyllis
 †Graptodictya
 †Grenevievella – or unidentified comparable form
 †Grivanella

H

   †Hallopora
 †Hallopora multitabulata
 †Harpidella
 †Healdia
 †Hebertella
 †Hebertella frankfortensis
 †Hebertella sinuata
 †Helcionella
 †Helicotoma
 †Helicotoma declivis
 †Helicotoma granosa – or unidentified comparable form
 †Helicotoma tennesseensis
 †Helicotoma verticalis – or unidentified comparable form
 †Heliomeroides
 †Heliomeroides teres – type locality for species
 †Hellopora
 †Hemiphragma
 †Hemithecella – type locality for genus
 †Hemithecella expansa – type locality for species
 †Hemitrypa
 †Hemitrypa proutana
 †Hesperorthis
 †Hesperorthis tricenaria – or unidentified comparable form
 †Heterotrypa
 †Holdenia
 †Holdenia typa
 †Holia
 †Holia cimelia – type locality for species
 †Holia secristi – type locality for species
  †Holopea
 †Holopea scrutator
 †Homagnostus
 †Homotelus
 †Homotelus elongatus
 †Homotelus simplex – or unidentified comparable form
 †Hormotoma
 †Howellella
 †Hustedograptus
 †Hustedograptus teretiusculus – or unidentified comparable form
 †Hyboaspis
 †Hyolithellus
 †Hyolithellus micans
 †Hyolithellus micras
 
  †Hyolithes
 †Hypseloconus
 †Hypseloconus bessemerense – or unidentified comparable form
 †Hystricurus – tentative report

I

  †Illaenus
 †Illaenus fieldi
 †Illaneus
 †Inflatia
 †Iridopteris
 †Iridopteris eriensis
 †Ischycondonta
 †Ischyrodonta
 †Ischyrodonta unionoides
 †Isochilina
 †Isochilina armata
  †Isotelus
 †Isotelus maximus
 †Isotelus megistos

K

 †Kingstonia
 †Kionoceras
 †Kirkbyella
 †Komaspidella
 †Komaspidella laevis
 †Komaspidella lata
  †Kootenia
 †Kootenia browni
 †Kootenia oblivia
 †Krausella
 †Krausella arcuata
 †Kullervo
 †Kullervo ornata – type locality for species
 †Kullervo parva – type locality for species
 †Kutorgina
 †Kutorgina cingulata

L

  †Labyrinthus
 †Lagenospermum
 †Lagenospermum imparirameum
 †Lambeophyllum
 †Laticrura – type locality for genus
 †Laticrura magna – type locality for species
 †Laticrura pionodema – type locality for species
  †Latouchella
 †Lecanospira
 †Lecanospira compacta
 †Leiorhynchus
 †Leiorhynchus mesicostale
 †Leperditella
 †Leperditella sulcata
 †Leperditia
 †Leperditia fabulites
  †Lepidodendron
 †Lepidodendropsis
 †Lepidodendropsis scobiniformis
 †Lepidodendropsis sigillarioides
 †Lepidodendropsis vandergrachti
 †Leptaena
 †Leptaena ordovicica – type locality for species
 †Leptellina
 †Leptellina transversa – type locality for species
 †Leptobolus
 †Leptocoelia
 †Leptocyrtoceras
 †Leptocyrtoceras virginianum
 †Leptodesma
 †Leptodesma potens
 †Leptodesma spinerigum
  †Levisoceras
 †Levisoceras ellipticum
 †Levisoceras instabile
 †Levisoceras transitum
 †Lichenaria
 †Lichenaria carterensis
 Lingula
 †Lingula nicklesi – or unidentified comparable form
 †Lingula nympha – or unidentified comparable form
 †Lingulasma
 †Lingulasma compactum – type locality for species
  †Lingulella – tentative report
 †Liocalymene
 †Liocalymene clintoni
 †Liospira
 †Liospira vitruvia
 †Lithostrontionella
 †Lithostrontionella prolifera
 †Llanoaspis
 †Llanoaspis convexifrons
  †Lonchodomas
 †Lonchodomas carinatus – type locality for species
 †Longispina
 †Longispina mucronatus
 †Lophonema – tentative report
 †Lophospira
 †Lophospira milleri
 †Lophospira perangulata
 †Loxobucania
 †Loxobucania emmonsi
 †Loxoplocus
 †Lyrodesma

M

 †Maclurina
 †Maclurina bigsbyi
 †Macluritella
 †Macluritella gyroceras
 †Macluritella multiseptarius – tentative report
 †Macluritella uniangulata
 †Maclurites
 †Maclurites magnus
 †Macrocoelia
 †Macrocoelia magna
 †Macrocoelia rotunda
 †Macropyge – tentative report
 †Marginovatia
 †Marginovatia minor
 †Marvillia
 †Marvillia bristolensis
 †Maryvillia
 †Maryvillia arion
 †Mastigobolbina
 †Mastigobolbina lata
 †Meekospira
 †Megambonia
 †Mesotaphraspis – type locality for genus
 †Mesotaphraspis inornata – type locality for species
 †Mesotaphraspis parva – type locality for species
 †Mesotrypa
  †Meteoraspis
 †Meteoraspis mutica
 †Mexicaspis
 †Michelinoceras
 †Microplasma
 †Microplasma fasciculatum
 †Mimella
 †Mimella globosa
 †Mimella melonica
 †Mimella vulgaris
  †Miraspis
 †Modiolopsis
 †Modiolopsis modiolaris
 †Monogonoceras
 †Monogonoceras magnisiphonatum
 †Monotrypa
 †Monticulipora
 †Multicostella
 †Multicostella brevis
 †Multicostella bursa
 †Multicostella platys
 †Multispinula
 †Multispinula cuneata
 †Muriceras
 †Mytilarca

N

  †Naticopsis
 †Naticopsis buttsi
 †Nemagraptus
 †Nemagraptus gracilis
 †Neozaphrentis
 †Nervostrophia
 †Nervostrophia nervosa
 †Nicholsonella
 †Nicholsonells
 †Nidulites
 †Nidulites pyriformis
 †Nileus
 †Niobe
 †Nisusia
 †Nisusia festinata
 †Nolichuckia
 †Nolichuckia casteri
 †Norwoodella
 †Norwoodella saffordi
 †Nothognathella
   Nucula
 Nuculana
 †Nuculites
 †Nuculopsis
 †Nuia

O

  †Odontopleura
 †Oepikina
 †Oepikina minnesoteniss – report made of unidentified related form or using admittedly obsolete nomenclature
 †Oepikina minnesotensis
   †Olenellus
  †Olenoides
 †Olenoides nitidus
 †Omospira
 †Omospira laticincta – or unidentified comparable form
 †Onchocephalites
 †Onchocephalites rotundiformis
 †Onchocephalus
 †Onniella
 †Onychoceras
 †Onychoceras subrotundum
 †Ophileta
 †Ophileta complanata
 †Ophiletina
 †Ophiletina sublaxa
 †Opikina
 †Opikina matutina – type locality for species
 †Opikina varia
 †Orbiculoidea
 †Orbignyella
 †Orthambonites
 †Orthambonites divaricatus
 †Orthoceras
 †Orthoceras multicameratum
 †Orthodesma
 †Orthodesma nasutum
 †Orthorhynchula
 †Orthorhynchula linneyi – or unidentified comparable form
 †Orthotetes
 †Otarion
 †Ottoseetaxis
 †Oulodus
 †Oulodus pectinata
 †Ovatia
 †Ovatia ovata – or unidentified comparable form
 †Oxoplecia
 †Oxoplecia gibbosa
 †Oxoplecia holstonensis
 †Oxoplecia hostonensis
 †Oxoplecia multicostellata
 †Oxoplecia simulatrix
 †Ozarkispira
 †Ozarkispira subelevata – type locality for species
 †Ozarkodina

P

 †Pachendoceras
 †Pachendoceras brevicameratum – type locality for species
 †Pachendoceras parvum
 †Pachydictya
 †Pachydictya robusta
 †Pachydictya senilis – or unidentified comparable form
 †Pachydomella – tentative report
 †Pachyglossella
 †Pachyglossella pachydermata
  †Pagetia
 †Pagetia ellsi
 †Palaeoneilo
 †Palaeoneilo petila
 †Palaeophycus – tentative report
 †Palaeostrophomena
 †Palaeostrophomena subtransversa – type locality for species
 †Paleocrinus
 †Paleocrinus striatus – or unidentified comparable form
 †Paleyoldia
 †Paractinoceras
 †Paractinoceras lamellosum
 †Parallelostroma
 †Parallelostroma kaugatomicum
 †Parallelostroma keyserense – type locality for species
 †Parallelostroma longicolumnum – type locality for species
 †Parallelostroma microporum
 †Parallelostroma multicolumnum – type locality for species
 †Parallelostroma typicum
 †Paraparchites – tentative report
 †Pararaphistoma – or unidentified comparable form
 †Parastrophina
 †Paratalarocrinus – type locality for genus
 †Paratalarocrinus transitorius – type locality for species
 †Paterina
 †Pattella
 †Pattella massanuttense
 †Paucicrura
 †Pauorthis
 †Paupospira
 †Paupospira burginensis
 †Paupospira sumnerensis
 †Paupospira tropidophora
 †Paurorthis
 †Paurorthis ponderosa
 †Pemphigaspis
  †Pentremites
 †Pentremites planus – tentative report
 †Perimecocoelia
 †Perimecocoelia semicostata
 †Perimecocoelia triangulata
 †Peronopora
 †Phaenopora
 †Phestia
 †Phillipsia
 †Pholidops
 †Pholidops areolata
 †Pholidops cincinnatiensis
 †Phragmolites
 †Phragmolites triangularis – or unidentified comparable form
 †Phragmorthis – type locality for genus
 †Phragmorthis buttsi – type locality for species
 †Phyllodictya
 †Phyllodictya frondosa
 †Phylloporina
 Pinna
 †Pionodema
 †Pionodema miniscula
 †Pionodema subaequata
  †Plaesiomys
   †Platyceras
 †Platycrinus
 †Platycrinus penicillus
 †Platyrachella
  †Platystrophia
 †Plectocamara
 †Plectoceras
 †Plectoceras bondi
 †Plectonotus
 †Plectorthis
 †Plectorthis exfoliata – or unidentified comparable form
 †Plethobolbina
 †Plethrospira – tentative report
 †Plexodictyon
 †Plexodictyon waparksi – or unidentified comparable form
 †Pliomerella
 †Pocononia
 †Pocononia whitei – type locality for species
 †Pojetaconcha – tentative report
 †Poliella
 †Poliella virginica
 †Polylopia
 †Polylopia billingsi
 †Polypora
 †Polypora impressa – tentative report
 †Posidonia
 †Posidonia becheri
 †Praenucula
 †Praenucula albertina
 †Prasopora
 †Primaspis
 †Primaspis ascitus – type locality for species
 †Primitiella
 †Primitiella constricta
 †Prioniodina
 †Prismostylus
 †Prismostylus fibratum
 †Probolichas
 †Probolichas pandus – type locality for species
 †Productella
 †Productorthis
 †Productorthis agilera
 †Productus
 †Productus altonensis
  †Proetus
 †Proetus crassimarginatus
 †Prothyris
 †Protobarinophyton
 †Protolepidodendron
 †Protolepidodendron primaevum
 †Protoleptostrophia
 †Protoleptostrophia perplana
 †Protostigmaria
 †Protostigmaria eggertiana
 †Protozyga
 †Protozyga uniplicata – type locality for species
 †Prozacanthoides
 †Prozacanthoides clearbranchensis
 †Prozacanthoides virginicus
 †Pseudagnostus
 †Pseudagnostus communis
 †Pseudosphaerexochus
 †Pterinea
 †Pterinea insueta
 †Pterinea maternata
 †Pterocephalops
 †Pterocephalops acrophthalma
 †Pterocrinus
 †Pterocrinus serratus
 †Pterygometopus
 †Ptychoglyptus
 †Ptychoglyptus virginiensis
 †Ptychopleurella
 †Ptychopleurella mediocostata – type locality for species
 †Ptychopleurella rectangulata – type locality for species
 †Ptychopleurella sulcata
 †Punctospirifer
 †Punctospirifer transversa – or unidentified comparable form
 †Punctospirifer transversus

Q

 †Quebecaspis
 †Quebecaspis conifrons
 †Quebecaspis marylandica

R

 †Rafinesquina
 †Rafinesquina altenata
 †Rafinesquina alternata
 †Rafinesquina deltoidea – or unidentified comparable form
 †Rafinesquina fracta
 †Rafinesquina obsoleta – or unidentified comparable form
 †Rafinesquina planulata – type locality for species
 †Rafinesquina pulchella
 †Raphistomina
 †Raymondaspis
 †Raymondaspis gregarius
 †Raymondella
 †Raymondella elegans
    †Receptaculites
 †Receptaculites biconstrictus
 †Receptaculites occidentalis
 †Redstonia
 †Redstonia cooperi
 †Regnellicystis
 †Regnellicystis typicalis
 †Remopleurides
 †Remopleurides asperulus – type locality for species
 †Remopleurides caelatus – type locality for species
 †Remopleurides caphyroides – type locality for species
 †Remopleurides eximius – type locality for species
 †Remopleurides plaesiourus – type locality for species
 †Remopleurides simulus – type locality for species
 †Resserella
 †Resserella rogata
 †Reticestus – tentative report
 †Reticulariina
 †Reticulariina spinosa – or unidentified comparable form
 †Reuschella
 †Reuschella americana – type locality for species
 †Reuschella edsoni
 †Rhacophyton
 †Rhacopteris
 †Rhinidictya
 †Rhinidictya nicholsoni
 †Rhipidomena
 †Rhipidomena tennesseensis
  †Rhodea
 †Rhodea blacksburgensis – type locality for species
 †Rhodea vespertina – type locality for species
 †Rhombopora
 †Rhombopora simulatrix
 †Rhynchotrema
 †Rhytimya
 †Robergia
 †Robergia major
 †Robergiella
 †Robergiella sagittalis – type locality for species
 †Robsonoceras
 †Rodea
 †Rodea vespertina – type locality for species
 Rostricellula
 †Rostricellula plena
 †Rostricellula pristina
 †Rothpletzella
 †Ruedemannia
 †Ruedemannia lirata

S

  †Salterella
 †Salterella conulata
 †Salteria
 †Salteria americana
 †Sanguinolites
 †Scaphorthis
 †Scaphorthis perplexa – type locality for species
 †Scenellopora
 †Scenellopora radiata
 †Schellwienella – tentative report
 †Schizambon
 †Schizambon cuneatus
 †Schizambon macrothyris
 †Schizodus
 †Schizophoria
 †Schizophoria impressa
 †Schizotreta
 †Schuchertella
 †Schuchertella desiderata
 †Schuchertella pandora
 †Scotoharpes
 †Sedgwickia
 †Sellenopora
 †Septopora
 †Septopora cestriensis
 †Sinuopea
 †Sinuopea basiplanata – or unidentified related form
 †Siphonodella
 †Siphonodella duplicata
 †Skenidioides
 †Skenidioides mediocostatus – type locality for species
 †Skenidioides transversus – type locality for species
  Solemya
  †Solenopora
 †Solenopora compacta
 †Sowerbyella
 †Sowerbyella acquistriata – or unidentified related form
 †Sowerbyella aequistriata – or unidentified comparable form
 †Sowerbyella curdsvillensis
 †Sowerbyella delicatula
 †Sowerbyella lebanonensis – or unidentified comparable form
 †Sowerbyella levanonensis – or unidentified comparable form
 †Sowerbyella negrita – or unidentified comparable form
 †Sowerbyella pisum
 †Sowerbyella rugosa
 †Sowerbyella sericea – report made of unidentified related form or using admittedly obsolete nomenclature
 †Sowerbyella silicica – type locality for species
 †Sowerbyella socialis
 †Sowerbyites
 †Sowerbyites triseptatus
 †Sowrbyella
 †Spathella
 †Spathognathodus
 †Spencella
 †Spencella virginica
  †Sphaerexochus
 †Sphaerexochus hapsidotus – type locality for species
 †Sphaerexochus pulcher – type locality for species
 †Sphaerocoryphe
 †Sphaerocoryphe gemina – type locality for species
 †Sphaerocoryphe longispina – type locality for species
 †Sphenotreta
 †Sphenotreta acutirostris
 †Spinatrypa
 †Spinatrypa spinosa
  †Spirifer
 †Spirifer bifurcatus
 †Spirifer macrus
 †Spirifer marcyi – tentative report
 †Spirifer mesistrialis
 †Spirifer stratiformis – or unidentified comparable form
 †Spirifer striatiformis – or unidentified comparable form
 †Spirifer varicosus
 †Spirifer winchelli – tentative report
 †Spongophylloides
 †Spyroceras
 †Stegerhynchus
 †Stegerhynchus neglectum
 †Stenoblepharum – broadly construed
 †Stenoblepharum strasburgense – type locality for species
 †Stenopareia
 †Stictopora
 †Strepulites
 †Stromatocerium
 †Stromatocerium rugosum
 †Stromatoceruium
 †Stromatoceruium rugosum
   †Strophomena
 †Strophomena emaciata
 †Strophomena filitexta
 †Strophomena incurvata
 †Strophomena sculpturatus
 †Strophomena tennesseensus
 †Strophomena tenuitesta
 †Strphomena
 †Strphomena incurvata
 †Subligaculum
 †Subulites
 †Subulites regularis
 †Sulevorthis
 †Sulevorthis bielsteini
 †Sulevorthis parvicrassicostatus
 †Synprioniodina
  †Syringopora
 †Syringopora virginica
 †Syringothyris
 †Syringothyris textus – or unidentified comparable form

T

 †Tabulipora
 †Tabulipora tuberculata
 †Taenicephalites
 †Taenicephalites macrops
 †Talarocrinus
 †Talarocrinus trijugis – or unidentified comparable form
 †Tancrediopsis
 †Taphrorthis
 †Taphrorthis peculiaris
 †Telephina
   †Tentaculites
 †Tentaculites lowdoni – type locality for species
 †Tentaculites minutus
 †Tentaculites scalaris
 †Terranovella
 †Terranovella dorsalis
 †Teteracamera – tentative report
 †Tetracamera
 †Tetradium
 †Tetradium cellulosum
 †Tetradium clarki – tentative report
 †Tetradium columnare – tentative report
 †Tetradium racemosum
 †Tetradium syringoporoides
 †Tetralobula
 †Tetralobula delicatula
 †Thaleops
 †Thaleops conradi
 †Titanambonites
 †Titanambonites crassus
 †Torynifer
 †Torynifer pseudolineata – or unidentified comparable form
 †Torynifer pseudolineatus
 †Tretaspis
 †Tretaspis sagenosus
  †Tricrepicephalus
 †Tricrepicephalus cedarensis
 †Tricrepicephalus simplex
 †Trinodus
 †Trinodus elspethi
 †Triphyllopteris
 †Triphyllopteris alleghanensis
 †Triphyllopteris biloba – type locality for species
 †Triphyllopteris lascuriana
 †Triphyllopteris latilobata – type locality for species
 †Triphyllopteris lescuriana
 †Triphyllopteris lesuriana
 †Triphyllopteris rarinervis – type locality for species
 †Triphyllopteris uberis
 †Triphyllopteris virginiana
 †Trocholitoceras
 †Trocholitoceras bevani
 †Trochonema
 †Trochonema bellulum
 †Trochonema trochonemoides – tentative report
 †Trochonema umbilicata
 †Tropidodiscus
   Trypanites
 †Tryplasma
 †Tubulibairdia
 †Tylothyris
 †Tylothyris mesacostalis

U

 †Ulrichia
 †Uncinulus

V

 †Valcourea
 †Valcourea crassa – or unidentified comparable form
 †Valcourea deflecta – or unidentified comparable form
 †Valcourea delfecta – or unidentified comparable form
 †Valcourea semicarinata – type locality for species
 †Vanuxemia
 †Vanuxemia crassa – or unidentified comparable form

W

 †Wilkingia
 †Wilsoniella
 †Woosteroceras
 †Woosteroceras chepultepecense – type locality for species

Z

 †Zaphrenthis
 †Zaphrenthis spinulosa
 †Zaphrentites
 †Zaphrentites spinulosa – or unidentified comparable form
 †Zelophyllum
 †Zygobolba
 †Zygobolba decora
 †Zygosella
 †Zygospira
 †Zygospira lebanonensis
 †Zygospira modesta

References
 

Paleozoic
Virginia